Shahzada Mirza Ulugh Tahir Bahadur (1830 – 13 October 1857) also known as Mirza Mendhi Sahib 
was a son of Mughal emperor Bahadur Shah II and  Karim un-nisa Khanum. He was killed (executed) at Delhi, 13 October 1857.

References

1830 births
1857 deaths
Mughal princes